University College of Engineering (UCEK), Kariavattom, Thiruvananthapuram is a premier engineering college run by the management of University of Kerala. The institute was established in the year 2000. The college functions in the Golden Jubilee Complex of the Karyavattom campus, University of Kerala, India.

After the establishment of APJ Abdul Kalam Technological University (formerly, Kerala Technological University) in 2014, UCEK is the only engineering college affiliated with the University of Kerala.

History 
The college was established in the year 2000 and is located in the Golden Jubilee Complex of the Kerala University at the Kariavattom Campus.

Departments
The institute offers four-year engineering undergraduate (B. Tech.) programmes in computer science and engineering, electronics and communication engineering, and information technology. The total number of student intake for each branch is limited to 66 seats (through allotment by the Commissioner of Entrance Examinations), with 33 seats reserved as merit, 30 seats being the management seats and 3 seats for NRI students.

CSE Department
ECE Department
IT Department

Student facilities

Library

The college has a dedicated library and is accessible to students at all times. It can accommodate around 150 users at a time. The books, journals, magazines and their back volumes, DVDs and all resources are available for the use of faculty and students of the institute. A student can issue up to a maximum of 3 books at a time for a duration of 15 days each.

Cafeteria and convenience stores

There are three canteens which provide food to students. The three cafeterias are located at three sides of the college for the convenience of the students.

College store caters to all needs of the students in connection with academics. The store supplies text books, practical manuals, note books, laboratory records, drawing instruments, and other stationary articles needed for the students, staff at a nominal cost

Transport facilities

The transport division in the college provides transport facility to students and staff. The college has got two buses operating in two different routes to cater to the needs of students coming from different parts of Thiruvananthapuram city. The two routes together cover almost all important points within the city.

Bank / ATM

A branch of State Bank of India is functioning inside the campus with its working hours are between 10am and 5pm. An SBI ATM is also provided near the main entry gate for the convenience of students.

Labs and healthcare

The college has a departmental based laboratories facility for the students. The major laboratories present within the campus include Communication Engineering Lab, Digital Signal Processing Lab, Hardware Interface Lab, Industrial electronics Lab, Internet Lab, Language Lab, Linear Integrated Circuit Lab, Microcontroller Lab, Microprocessor Lab, Network Lab, Multimedia Lab, Microwave Engineering Lab and MATLAB.

A healthcare team including doctors, nurses and health workers works to provide health care services to students and staffs in need within the campus. Moreover, the campus is situated next to Kerala University Health Centre in case for any emergency.

Student clubs and technical societies 
The main clubs operating within the campus include:

IEEE Student Branch

An IEEE student body started functioning at the campus since 2020. A majority of student population are involved with the branch. A wide array of activities are conducted by the branch.

Research and development cell

The cell consists of a four-member research committee each from the four departments.

Innovation and Entrepreneurship Development Centre

The Innovation and Entrepreneurship Development Centre, nurtured by KSUM is set up within the campus serving as a catalyst for entrepreneurship at the institute by supporting and incubating entrepreneurial ideas.

Developer students clubs

Developer student clubs are university based community groups for students interested in Google developer technologies. The club organize seminars, study jams, workshops and quizzes throughout the year.

Free and Open Source Software Cell

The cell's activities are bound in participation with the members of the institutions and ICFOSS. These deeds of the Cell aim in promoting FOSS activities through a group of interested students and teachers of the institution, on a voluntary basis.

Career Guidance and Placement Cell

The Career Guidance and Placement Cell of the college is responsible for placement drives at the campus. The Cell includes the Coordinator and the committee members of each department. The major recruiters includes the likes of TCS, Infosys, UST Global, Wipro, IBM, Speridian and CTS.

College fests 
There are two main college fests that are conducted in UCEK. The Winter semester hosts the Snigdha fests and/or Renvnza around the first week of January. The fest is a typical charity event for unprivileged children. Renvenza, the annual techno-cultural fest hosted by UCEK is one of the most celebrated fest in the state.

Meanwhile, the summer semester is reserved for the cultural Ace fest which has been one of the major crowd magnet for the institution.

Apart from these the various clubs operating within the institution also organize college level competitions and events for the overall development of the students.

References

2000 establishments in Kerala
Educational institutions established in 2000
Engineering colleges in Thiruvananthapuram
Colleges affiliated to the University of Kerala